is a passenger railway station located in Izumi-ku, Yokohama, Japan, operated by the private railway operator Sagami Railway (Sotetsu).

Lines 
Ryokuentoshi Station is served by the Sagami Railway Izumino Line, and lies 3.1 kilometers from the starting point of the line at Futamatagawa Station.

Station layout
The station consists of two opposed side platforms serving two tracks, with an elevated station building.

Platforms

Adjacent stations

History 
Ryokuentoshi Station was opened on April 8, 1976.

Passenger statistics
In fiscal 2019, the station was used by an average of 25,276 passengers daily.

The passenger figures for previous years are as shown below.

Surrounding area
 Nakaman Gakuin Ryokuen City School
 Sotetsu Cultural Center
Ferris University (Ryokuen campus)

See also
 List of railway stations in Japan

References

External links 

 Official home page  

Railway stations in Kanagawa Prefecture
Railway stations in Japan opened in 1976
Railway stations in Yokohama